Marios Lekkas is a Greek model. He was born in Athens, Greece on April 5, 1979, and started modeling when he was 23 years old. Most recently, Lekkas walked the runway for Frankie Morello, Gazzarini, Giorgio Armani and Versace during Milan Fashion week.  Lekkas has been the face for at least three fragrance campaigns in the past six years of his career: Bvlgari, Max Factor and Ungaro Man.

Lekkas is currently represented by at least 17 modelling agencies, including Fashion Model Management (Milan), MGM Models (Paris), DNA Models (New York City), Next Models (London), and View Management (Barcelona).

References

External links
Official website
Marilyn Agency
DNA Models
Storm Models
View Management

Greek male models
Living people
1979 births
Models from Athens